The Alaska State Senate is the upper house in the Alaska Legislature, the state legislature of the U.S. state of Alaska. It convenes in the Alaska State Capitol in Juneau, Alaska and is responsible for making laws and confirming or rejecting gubernatorial appointments to the state cabinet, commissions and boards.

With just twenty members, the Alaska Senate is the smallest state legislative chamber in the United States. Its members serve four-year terms and each represent an equal number of districts with populations of approximately 35,512 people, per 2010 Census figures. They are not subject to term limits.

Powers and legislative process
The Alaska Senate shares the responsibility for making laws in the state of Alaska. Bills are developed by staff from bill requests and information from the bill's sponsor. Bills undergo three or four readings during the legislative process. After the first reading, they are assigned to committee. Committees can amend measures or hold legislation and prevent it from reaching the Senate floor. Once a committee has weighed in on a piece of legislation, the bill returns to the floor for second hearing and a third hearing, which happens just before the floor vote on it.

Once passed by the Senate, a bill is sent to the opposite legislative house for consideration. If approved, without amendment, it is sent to the governor. If there is amendment, however, the Senate may either reconsider the bill with amendments or ask for the establishment of a conference committee to work out differences in the versions of the bill passed by each chamber. Once a piece of legislation approved by both houses is forwarded to the governor, it may either be signed or vetoed. If it is signed, it takes effect on the effective date of the legislation. If it is vetoed, lawmakers in a joint session may override the veto with a two-thirds majority vote (three-fourths majority is required if it is an appropriations bill).

For gubernatorial nominees requiring confirmation, the Alaska Senate sits in joint session with the Alaska House and the two bodies vote together on confirmation, with each representative and senator having one vote.

Committees
Current committees include:

Current composition

Past partisan compositions can be found on Political party strength in Alaska.

Membership

Qualifications and terms
Senators must be a qualified voter and resident of Alaska for no less than three years, and a resident of the district from which elected for one year immediately preceding filing for office. A senator must be at least 25 years old at the time the oath of office is taken.

Senators may expel a member with the concurrence of two-thirds of the membership of the body. This has happened only once in Senate history. On February 5, 1982, the Senate of the 12th Legislature expelled Bethel senator George Hohman from the body. Hohman was convicted of bribery in conjunction with his legislative duties on December 24, 1981, and had defiantly refused to resign from his seat. Expulsion was not a consideration during the 2003–2010 Alaska political corruption probe, as Ben Stevens and John Cowdery were the only Senators who were subjects of the probe and neither sought reelection in 2008.

Legislative terms begin on the second Monday in January following a presidential election year and on the third Tuesday in January following a gubernatorial election. The term of senators is four years and half of the senators are up for election every two years.

Leadership
The President of the Senate presides over the body, appointing members to all of the Senate's committees and joint committees, and may create other committees and subcommittees if desired. Unlike many other states, the Lieutenant Governor of Alaska does not preside over the Senate. Instead, the Lieutenant Governor oversees the Alaska Division of Elections, fulfilling the role of Secretary of State. Only two other states, Hawaii and Utah, have similar constitutional arrangements for their lieutenant governors. The other partisan Senate leadership positions, such as the Majority and Minority leaders, are (usually) elected by their respective party caucuses to head their parties in the chamber.

Current leadership

Members of the 33rd Senate

Past composition of the Senate

See also

 Alaska House of Representatives
 Alaska State Capitol
 List of Alaska State Legislatures

References

External links
 Alaska State Senate official government website
 Project Vote Smart – State Senate of Alaska

Senate
State upper houses in the United States